NGC 6886 is a planetary nebula in the constellation Sagitta. It was discovered by Ralph Copeland on September 17, 1884. It is  distant from Earth, and is composed of a hot central post-AGB star that has 55% of the Sun's mass yet  2700 ± 850 its luminosity, with a surface temperature of 142,000 K. The planetary nebula is thought to have been expanding for between 1280 and 1600 years.

References

External links
 

Planetary nebulae
Sagitta (constellation)
6886
Astronomical objects discovered in 1884